Ilias Atmatsidis (born 24 April 1969) is a Greek former professional footballer who played as a goalkeeper. He is the Director of Football at AEK Athens B.

Club career
Atmatsidis started playing football regularly in his village team at the age of 13 competing as a winger. In a match against Foufa Ptolemaidas where the team's goalkeeper could not compete, Atmatsidis was called to play as goalkeeper. His performance established him in the position under the team's goalposts. He was then transferred to the team of the neighboring village of Agios Dimitrios, with which he was crowned champion of the local second division. He was then transferred to Pontius Kozani with whom he played in the fourth national division and at the age of 18 he joined Pontioi Veria, where he played for 3 years contributing to the promotion of the team to the second division. In the summer of 1992 he was signed by AEK Athens.

In his first year in the team he was the substitute of Antonis Minou, but from the following season he established himself as a starter for many years, while he was among the captains of the club. A remarkable performance of Atmatsidis was when he made a double save on a penalty by Anastasiou and then on a shot by Tsiantakis in a championship match with OFI. For the seasons 1997-1998 and 1998-1999 he was voted for the PSAP awards as the best goalkeeper of the league. He scored once with a penalty in a crucial championship match against Skoda Xanthi in 1999. He had another outstanding performance in the league derby against Olympiacos in 1997, where he kept the clean seat and AEK won by 0–1. From 2000 onwards he began to lose his position to Dionysis Chiotis. He won in his 10-year presence at AEK 2 championships, 4 Greek cups and 1 Super Cup. In January 2003 the Atmatsidis asked to be released to get more playing time and his contract was terminated by mutual consent.

After leaving AEK, Atmatsidis signed for PAOK for three years, where he ended his career in 2005. In the club of Thessaloniki, he won another cup in 2003. In January 2014 he came out of retirement to play for local Herakleion based club Omonia NOVA Apolimantiki.

International career
Atmatsidis debuted for Greece on 23 March 1994. He played 47 matches, and was included in the 1994 FIFA World Cup, playing as starting goalkeeper in the 0–4 loss against Bulgaria. At November 1999, he decided to retire from the national team, as a sign of protest against refereeing in Greek football.

After football
In October 2014, Atmatsidis has been in the technical department of the infrastructure departments of AEK until 2019, when he was for a short period an assistant manager to Nikos Kostenoglou. In July 2021 he was appointed as a Director of Football at AEK Athens B.

Honours

AEK Athens
Alpha Ethniki: 1992–93, 1993–94
Greek Cup: 1995–96, 1996–97, 1999–2000, 2001–02
Greek Super Cup: 1996

PAOK
Greek Cup: 2002–03

Individual
Super League Greece Goalkeeper of the Year: (2) 1997–98, 1998–99

References

External links

Weltfussball 

1969 births
Living people
Greek footballers
Greece international footballers
AEK Athens F.C. players
PAOK FC players
1994 FIFA World Cup players
Association football goalkeepers
Super League Greece players
Footballers from Kozani
AEK F.C. non-playing staff
Greek beach soccer players